Euis is a female Sundanese given name. It is derived from the Sundanese root word Geulis, meaning beautiful. Other forms of this name are Elis, Deuis, and Iis.

Euis as first name was found 161 times in 8 different countries.

Possible meanings 
The meaning of the name Asep depends on the language used.

 In Sundanese, Euis derived from Geulis, means "beautiful".
 In Indonesian, Euis means “a peaceful, independent, happy and perfect way of life”.

Notable people with this name 
 Euis Darliah, an Indonesian singer who was once famous for the song "Apanya Dong" by Titiek Puspa.
 Euis Sunarti, a professor at the Bogor Agricultural Institute (1987) in the field of family resilience and empowerment.

See also

References 

Given names
Sundanese feminine given names